The China International Silk Road Center (formerly Greenland Center) is a supertall skyscraper under construction in Xi'an, Shaanxi, China. The original design called for a -tall building, but the height was changed to  because of new skyscraper regulations in China. The skyscraper will be the tallest in Xi'an. It is being developed by Chinese developer Greenland Group.

See also
 List of tallest buildings in China

References

Skyscrapers in Xi'an
Skyscraper office buildings in China
Residential skyscrapers in China